Kevin Simm (born 3 December 1968) is an English professional darts player who competes in Professional Darts Corporation events.

Career
Simm reached the last 40 of the 2008 Winmau World Masters, losing to Robbie Green.

Simm qualified for the 2017 PDC World Darts Championship after reaching the Final of the PDPA Qualifier in Wigan. He went on to beat Gilbert Ulang 2-0 in the preliminary round before losing 0-3 to Ian White in the first round.

World Championship results

PDC
 2017: First round (lost to Ian White 0–3)

References

External links

1968 births
English darts players
People from Tyldesley
Living people